The New Jersey County Colleges is a system of 18 public community colleges, encompassing more than 60 campuses in the U.S. state of New Jersey.  , there are 18 county colleges statewide; this reflects the fact that each college serves one of New Jersey's 21 counties, except for Atlantic Cape Community College, Raritan Valley Community College, and Rowan College of South Jersey, each of which serves two counties.

In 2003, former governor James McGreevey created the New Jersey Community Colleges Compact, with Executive Order No. 81, as a statewide partnership to enable cooperation between the colleges and various state departments. The compact is administered by the New Jersey Council of County Colleges, which makes recommendations on the deployment and use of county college resources.  The Council also provides educational and training materials to the college administrations to further their goals.  The Council was founded in 1989 under statute 18A:64A-26 of the New Jersey legislature to promote the advancement of the county community colleges of New Jersey. In 2003, the state further established the Community College Consortium for Workforce and Economic Development as a single point of contact for employers looking for skilled workers in New Jersey.

The county colleges of New Jersey represent 56% of all undergraduate students in the state and offer studies in 1,700 degree and certificate programs. Reflecting long-term trends nationwide, the male-to-female ratio of students in the system is 41% male to 59% female, and 48% of students are over the age of 24. Overall, the system enrolls more than 350,000 students each year on campuses that range in size from 1,300 students at Salem Community College to over 15,000 students at Bergen Community College.

Not all of the county colleges were founded by the State of New Jersey; the oldest county college in New Jersey, Union County College, was founded in 1933 by the Federal Emergency Relief Administration as Union County Junior College; it operated as a private college from 1936 to 1982, and merged with the publicly operated Union County Technical Institute in 1982 to become the current public institution.

List

Selected statistics

Source: Hudson County Community College. Its sources: New Jersey Council of County Colleges; Population Division, U.S. Census Bureau, August 2006.

Notes
  Each college's founding year is linked to the category of all schools founded in that year.

See also

College admissions in the United States
Lists of universities and colleges
Post-secondary education in New Jersey
Transfer admissions in the United States

References

External links
New Jersey Council of County Colleges

County Colleges
New Jersey County Colleges